SuAndi OBE is a British performance poet, writer and arts curator. Based in North West England, she is particularly acknowledged for raising the profile of black artists in the region as well as nationally. Since 1985 she has been Cultural Director of the National Black Arts Alliance. She was appointed an OBE in 1999 for her contributions to the Black Arts sector.

Life

Her career in the arts from the 1980s onwards encompasses participating in Identity Writers Workshop and being a co-founder of BlackScribe, the North West's first Black women's writing collective. She was active as a dancer and model before starting to perform her poetry in 1985. Since the mid-1980s she has also been the freelance Cultural Director of the National Black Arts Alliance, the UK's largest network of Black artists. As the Black Women Writers Development worker at Commonword (where she shared an office with Lemn Sissay), she co-edited Commonword's first anthology of Black poetry, Black and Priceless.

SuAndi has performed at poetry venues and festivals both nationally and internationally. She has also developed performance works with a sustained structure and visual component to them, including This is All I've Got to Say (1993) and The Story of M, commissioned by the Institute of Contemporary Arts in 1994.  The Story of M was a solo performance piece written in tribute to SuAndi's mother. While sitting in a white-screened hospital ward, visual projections of family photographs accompany the performer's memories of her mother's life and death.

SuAndi has written two librettos: Mary Seacole had a West End opening and toured Britain in 2000, and The Calling was performed by the BBC Philharmonic in 2005.

Since 2001 she has coordinated the regional celebration of Black History Month in the North West.

Afro Solo UK chronicles the lives of African men in the UK since 1925. Strength of our Mothers (2019) was a series of interviews with 23 white women in interracial relationships with African and Afro-Caribbean men. Her poems "Intergenerational Trauma" and "Aroma of memory" are included in the 2019 anthology New Daughters of Africa, edited by Margaret Busby.

Awards
In 1996 SuAndi was awarded a Winston Churchill Fellowship. In the 1999 New Year Honours she received an OBE for her contributions to black art in Britain. She also received a Windrush Inspirational Award in 1003, and a NESTA Dreamtime Award in 2005. In 2014 she became an Honorary Creative Writing Fellow at Leicester University, and she has received honorary doctorates from both the University of Lancaster, in 2015 for her outstanding contribution to British art, and from Manchester Metropolitan University in 2018, for her "significant contribution to art and culture, in particular to the black arts sector and within the North West".

Selected works
 Style in Performance. Purple Heather & Pankhurst Press, 1990. 
 Nearly Forty. Spike Books, 1992. 
 There Will be No Tears. Manchester: Pankhurst Press, 1995.
 (Editor) 4 for more: poses a contextualisation of black work juxtaposed to the larger arena. Manchester: ArtBlacklive Publication for Black Arts Alliance, 2002. 
 I Love the Blackness of my People, 2003.
 "Africa Lives On in We: Histories and Futures of Black Women Artists", in E. Aston et al. (eds), Feminist Futures?, Palgrave Macmillan, 2006.
 The Story of M. London: Oberon Books, 2017. 
 (Editor) Strength of Our Mothers. Independent Publishing Network, 2019.

Further reading
  Abram, Nicola (2020). "SuAndi", in Black British Women's Theatre: Intersectionality, Archives, Aesthetics, Palgrave Macmillan, pp. 201–224, .

References

External links
 "SuAndi of National Black Arts Alliance on justice in arts funding", Platform, 28 January 2015.

1951 births
Living people
English spoken word artists
English women poets
Black British women writers
Writers from Manchester
British people of Nigerian descent
20th-century English poets
21st-century English poets
English curators
British women curators
Alumni of Lancaster University
Officers of the Order of the British Empire
People from Hulme
20th-century English women
21st-century English women